Voice in the Mirror, also known as How Lonely the Night and This Day Alone, is a 1958 American CinemaScope film noir drama film directed by Harry Keller and starring Richard Egan and Julie London.

Plot
After sinking into the depths of drunken despair due to the death of his daughter, a man is warned by his doctor that he is on the brink of terminal mental illness. Struck by a fellow alcoholic's suggestion that perhaps he should try faith, he begins saving not only himself but others, eventually creating Alcoholics Anonymous.

Cast
 Richard Egan as Jim Burton
 Julie London as Ellen Burton
 Walter Matthau as Dr. Karnes
 Troy Donahue as Paul Cunningham
 Harry Bartell as Harry Graham
 Peggy Converse as Mrs. Harriet Cunningham – Paul's Mother
 Ann Doran as Mrs. Deviln
 Mae Clarke as Mrs. Robbins
 Max Showalter as Don Martin (as Casey Adams)
 Hugh Sanders as A.W. Hornsby
 Ken Lynch as Frank – Bartender 
 Dorris Singleton as Liz Perkins
 Dave Barry as Quintet Planist
 Alan Dexter as Bartender
 Arthur O'Connell as Bill Tobin

References

External links
 
 
 

1958 films
Film noir
Universal Pictures films
CinemaScope films
American drama films
Films directed by Harry Keller
1958 drama films
1950s English-language films
1950s American films